Große Aschbergschanze was a ski jumping large hill in Klingenthal, Germany.

History
The hill was opened in 1959 and owned by SC Traktor Oberwiesenthal. It hosted an FIS Ski jumping World Cup event in 1986. Jens Weißflog holds the hill record. It was closed in 1990. In 2006 it was replaced by a new ski jumping venue, Vogtlandarena, at another site in Klingenthal.

References 

Ski jumping venues in Germany
Sports venues in Saxony
1959 establishments in Germany